Eryxia holosericea is a species of leaf beetle. It is distributed in the Democratic Republic of the Congo, Yemen, Mali, Senegal, Gabon, the Republic of the Congo and Ivory Coast. It was described by the German entomologist Johann Christoph Friedrich Klug in 1835.

References 

Eumolpinae
Beetles of the Democratic Republic of the Congo
Insects of the Arabian Peninsula
Insects of West Africa
Insects of Gabon
Insects of the Republic of the Congo
Beetles described in 1835